Tour of Slovenia is a stage race cycling race held in Slovenia. Between 2005 and 2018, it was organised as a 2.1 race on the UCI Europe Tour. The 2019 edition was classified as a 2.HC race. It became part of the UCI ProSeries in 2020.

Winners

Classifications
As of the 2022 edition, the jerseys worn by the leaders of the individual classifications are:
  Green Jersey – Worn by the leader of the general classification.
  Red Jersey – Worn by the leader of the points classification.
  Blue Jersey – Worn by the leader of the mountains classification. 
  White Jersey – Worn by the best rider under 23 years of age on the overall classification.

Notes

References

External links

 
 

 
Cycle races in Slovenia
UCI Europe Tour races
Recurring sporting events established in 1993
1993 establishments in Slovenia
Articles containing video clips
Summer events in Slovenia